Geri Montano, otherwise known as Geralyn Marie Montano, is a contemporary Native American artist who incorporates themes of Native American heritage, feminism, and societal issues into her work.

Biography 
She attended the San Francisco Art Institute, where she graduated with a BFA degree in interdisciplinary arts in 1997. She currently works as an art instructor for Creativity Explored in San Francisco.

Exhibitions

Solo 

 "Resistance in the Land of Red Apples" at Humboldt State University (November 2018)
 "Traded Moons" at Galeria de la Raza (throughout April 7 - May 12 of 2012)
 second showing - "FAX" at the San Francisco Arts Commission Gallery (2012)

Group 

 "Cinco y Cinco/Five and Five" at the Mexican Museum (2016)
"Processing War and Trauma" at the Kearny Street Workshop (San Francisco, CA in 2013)
"N.D.N. Native Diaspora Now" in the Galeria de la Raza (San Francisco, CA in 2012)
"Chicana/o Biennial" at the MACLA (San Jose, CA in 2012)
"PACHANGA" in the Galeria de la Raza (San Francisco, CA in 2011) 
"Doll Sculpture Show" in the Seattle Center (Seattle, WA in 2002)
"Requiem for Mother" at the San Francisco Arts Institute - Diego Rivera Gallery (San Francisco, CA in 1997)
"Student Sculpture Show" at the San Francisco Arts Institute - Diego Rivera Gallery (San Francisco, CA in 1996)

Permanent collections 

 A is for Apple; I is NOT for Indian, Crocker Art Museum
Three Moons and the Fruit of her Womb, Crocker Art Museum
Moon Dreaming, the Mexican Museum

Honors and awards 

 'Native American Arts & Cultural Traditions - Creative Capacity' grant (2011)
 'Native American Arts & Cultural Traditions' grant from the San Francisco Arts Commission (2012)

References

External links 
 Official website

Living people
Year of birth missing (living people)
Native American women artists
Navajo artists
American people of Comanche descent
People from Colorado
Artists from Colorado
San Francisco Art Institute alumni
American contemporary artists
21st-century American women